The 1922 Camberwell North by-election was held on 20 February 1922.  The by-election was held due to the resignation of the incumbent Coalition Conservative MP, Henry Newton Knights.  It was won by the Labour candidate Charles Ammon.

References

Camberwell North by-election
Camberwell North by-election
Camberwell North,1922
Camberwell North by-election
Camberwell North,1922
Camberwell